Telecast may refer to:
Television broadcast
Telecast (band), a Christian band from the United States

See also
Telecaster, guitar